Protoperigea anotha, the kaslo rustic, is a species of cutworm or dart moth in the family Noctuidae. It is found in North America.

The MONA or Hodges number for Protoperigea anotha is 9642.

References

Further reading

 
 
 

Caradrinini
Articles created by Qbugbot
Moths described in 1904